HMS Phoenix was a 44-gun fifth-rate ship of the Royal Navy. She was launched in 1759 and sunk in 1780 and saw service during the American War of Independence.

Launch

Phoenix was launched in 1759 under Captain Prince Edward, Duke of York and Albany

Activities in North America

Naval operations
Phoenix saw service during the American War of Independence under Captain Hyde Parker, Jr. The ship was assigned to New York and by 5 June 1776 was laying off Sandy Hook, New Jersey with a small flotilla of ships. Later that month, Phoenix captured at least three ships and disrupted an American attack on a lighthouse near Sandy Hook. In the early days of July 1776, Phoenix, along with Rose and Greyhound moved toward Red Hook, Brooklyn and anchored at Gravesend, Brooklyn.

During that attack, Phoenix and the other ships easily passed rebel defences and bombarded urban New York for two hours. This action largely confirmed Continental fears that the Royal Navy could act with relative impunity when attacking deep-water ports. Phoenix continued to harass patriot positions along the Hudson River till 16 August when she withdrew back to the waters off of Staten Island. Maps from that autumn show Phoenix and Rose again in the waters south of Manhattan. She captured 2 prizes off Cape Henry in February, 1777.

Counterfeiting
Phoenix was also involved in a kind of currency war. During the Revolutionary War, the Continental Congress authorized the printing of paper currency called continental currency. As early as January 1776, John and George Folliott began counterfeiting Continental $30 bills on Phoenix. The counterfeiting operation on Phoenix ran until at least April 1777. The counterfeit notes could be purchased for the price of the paper they were printed on. Inflation was indeed a major problem for the rebelling colonists, reaching monthly levels of 47 percent by November 1779. And the Phoenix counterfeiting contributed, at least in part, to such staggering currency problems.

Loss

Phoenix, under Captain Hyde Parker, sunk on the night of 4 October 1780. The loss occurred during a major hurricane that disabled Britain's entire fleet in the West Indies. The loss was memorably recorded by Lieutenant Archer in a letter of 6 November 1780:
 Before she sank, the crew cut the mainmast away after the storm felled it.

Over the course of three days, the crew was able to land provisions and stores on the shore of Cuba, a hostile territory then a possession of Spain. Hyde Parker ordered his crew to repair the damaged cutter and then dispatched it toward Montego Bay in Jamaica. A rescue mission of three fishing boats and, later, the sloop Porcupine evacuated the survivors. Phoenix had lost 20 men when the mainmast fell. The surviving 240 men reached Montego Bay safely on 15 October.

Citations and references 
Citations

References
Hepper, David J. (1994) British Warship Losses in the Age of Sail, 1650–1859. (Rotherfield: Jean Boudriot). 

Frigates of the Royal Navy
Ships built in Limehouse
1759 ships
Shipwrecks in the Caribbean Sea
Counterfeiters
Maritime incidents in 1780